Enterococcus avium, a species of Enterococcus, is most commonly found in birds.  Rarely, it is also a cause of infection in humans, and in such cases, may be vancomycin-resistant, and is referred to as VREA.  VREA cases in humans have been successfully treated with linezolid.

References

External links
 Type strain of Enterococcus avium at BacDive -  the Bacterial Diversity Metadatabase

avium
Bacteria described in 1967